Billy Thomas (born December 23, 1975) is an American former professional basketball player who competed in the National Basketball Association (NBA) and several other leagues. A 6'5" (1.96 m) tall shooting guard from Shreveport, Louisiana, he last played with the Maine Red Claws of the NBA Development League. Billy Thomas is now the basketball head coach of Rockhurst High School

College career
In his college career, Thomas set a KU record making 269 3-point field goals (that record was later broken by Jeff Boschee). He also holds the school record for 3-point field goals made in a conference game, connecting on eight of them in a game against Texas on January 10, 1998.

Professional career
Thomas went undrafted after graduating from the University of Kansas in 1998.

In 2001, Thomas averaged 27.6 points in 10 games for the Tanduay Rhum Masters under coach Derick Pumaren in the Philippine Basketball Association.

In 2002–03, Thomas won the NBDL Sportsmanship Award while playing for the Greenville Groove. He played for the Dakota Wizards of the Continental Basketball Association (CBA) and was named the CBA Newcomer of the Year and a member of the All-CBA First Team in 2005.

He began his NBA career during the 2004–2005 season by signing a 10-day contract with the New Jersey Nets on January 20, 2005. Thomas later signed a second 10-day contract and eventually was signed for the remainder of the season. He appeared in 25 games that year and averaged 3.7 points per game.

On March 3, 2006, he signed a 10-day contract with the Washington Wizards.  He played in 17 games and averaged 2.2 points per game.

Thomas began the 2007–2008 season with the Colorado 14ers of the D-League.  In 27 games (27 starts), prior to his second NBA call-up, Thomas averaged 15.7 points, 3.4 rebounds and 3.7 assists per game.  Thomas was selected to play in the 2008 D-League All-Star Game.

On December 24, 2007, Thomas was signed to a ten-day contract with the New Jersey Nets.  He played in four games with the Nets, scoring a total of two points. On February 22, 2008, Thomas was signed to a ten-day contract by the Cleveland Cavaliers so they would have enough players to face the Washington Wizards that night, due to a depleted roster because of a blockbuster trade the day prior.  Thomas saw his first action as a Cavalier that very night, playing 19 minutes and scoring 9 points on three three-point shots.  Thomas hoisted 11 three-point field goal attempts, his career high.

On March 3, 2008, the Cavaliers signed Thomas to a second ten-day contract.  His contract expired on March 13, 2008, allowing him to become a free agent.

On March 20, 2008, Thomas returned to the Colorado 14ers.

On April 16, 2008, the Cavaliers signed Thomas for the remainder of the season and the 2008 playoffs.  He played in seven regular-season games for the Cavaliers scoring 12 total points (on four three-point field goals made) grabbed two rebounds and made one steal. Thomas logged eight minutes over three playoff games.  He scored three points (on a three-point field goal) and had a rebound, an assist and a steal.

Thomas played for the Cavaliers' 2008 NBA Summer League team in Las Vegas.  He started both games that he played and averaged five points, two rebounds, two assists, one steal and a half a block per game.

Thomas has played in numerous other leagues during his professional basketball career: the USBL, the CBA, the IBL, the D-League, the Argentine League, the Italian League, the Serbian League, the Adriatic League, the Greek League and the ULEB Cup.

On September 2, 2009, Thomas was drafted by the Maine Red Claws in the third round of the NBA Development League Expansion Draft.

Coaching career
Thomas is the owner of the "Billy Thomas Hoops Academy", located in Kansas City, Missouri. Beginning in the 2010–2011 season, Thomas is also the head coach of the boys' varsity basketball team at The Barstow School in Kansas City, Missouri. In the 2015–2016 season, the Barstow Boys' Basketball team was ranked first in the small school category by The Kansas City Star. Now he coaches the Rockhurst High School basketball team.

NBA career statistics

Regular season

|-
| align="left" | 2004–05
| align="left" | New Jersey
| 25 || 0 || 14.2 || .362 || .304 || .778 || 1.4 || .7 || .6 || .0 || 3.7
|-
| align="left" | 2005–06
| align="left" | Washington
| 17 || 0 || 7.7 || .325 || .333 || 1.000 || .8 || .5 || .6 || .1 || 2.2
|-
| align="left" | 2007–08
| align="left" | New Jersey
| 4 || 0 || 2.0 || .000 || .000 || 1.000 || .0 || .0 || .0 || .0 || .5
|-
| align="left" | 2007–08
| align="left" | Cleveland
| 7 || 0 || 4.9 || .286 || .308 || .000 || .3 || .0 || .1 || .0 || 1.7
|- class="sortbottom"
| style="text-align:center;" colspan="2"| Career
| 53 || 0 || 10.0 || .338 || .304 || .846 || 1.0 || .5 || .5 || .0 || 2.7

Playoffs

|-
| align="left" | 2005
| align="left" | New Jersey
| 2 || 0 || 1.0 || .000 || .000 || .000 || .0 || .0 || .0 || .0 || .0
|-
| align="left" | 2006
| align="left" | Washington
| 3 || 0 || 4.7 || .000 || .000 || .500 || .3 || .0 || .0 || .0 || .7
|-
| align="left" | 2008
| align="left" | Cleveland
| 3 || 0 || 2.7 || .500 || .500 || .000 || .3 || .3 || .3 || .0 || 1.0
|- class="sortbottom"
| style="text-align:center;" colspan="2"| Career
| 8 || 0 || 3.0 || .100 || .167 || .500 || .3 || .1 || .1 || .0 || .6

Notes

External links
kuathletics.com
basketball-reference.com

1975 births
Living people
ABA League players
American expatriate basketball people in Argentina
American expatriate basketball people in Greece
American expatriate basketball people in Italy
American expatriate basketball people in the Philippines
American expatriate basketball people in Serbia
American men's basketball players
Basketball players from Shreveport, Louisiana
Cincinnati Stuff players
CBA All-Star Game players
Cleveland Cavaliers players
Colorado 14ers players
Greek Basket League players
Greenville Groove players
Kansas Jayhawks men's basketball players
Kavala B.C. players
KK Crvena zvezda players
Maine Red Claws players
New Jersey Nets players
Pallacanestro Trieste players
Philippine Basketball Association imports
Regatas Corrientes basketball players
Shooting guards
Sioux Falls Skyforce (CBA) players
Tanduay Rhum Masters players
Undrafted National Basketball Association players
Washington Wizards players